Emotion Review is a peer-reviewed scholarly journal published by Sage Publications in association with the International Society for Research on Emotions (ISRE).

It is indexed in the Social Sciences Citation Index, Journal Citation Reports, and Current Contents.

Aims and scope 

Emotion Review publishes articles covering the whole spectrum of emotions research. It is an interdisciplinary journal publishing work in anthropology, biology, computer science, economics, history, humanities, linguistics, neuroscience, philosophy, physiology, political science, psychiatry, psychology, sociology, and in other areas where emotion research is active.

The journal focuses on a combination of theoretical, conceptual, and review papers. It allows commentaries given its aim to enhance debate about critical issues in emotion theory and research.
Articles do not include reports of empirical studies.

Editor 

Editor-in-Chief: Christine R. Harris,  University of California, San Diego, USA

References

External links 
Emotion Review
International Society for Research on Emotions (Emotion Review)

Psychology journals
Emotion